Qafl Shamer District is a district of the Hajjah Governorate, Yemen. As of 2003, the district had a population of 50,439 inhabitants.

References

Districts of Hajjah Governorate